The 2019 Challenger ATP Cachantún Cup was a professional tennis tournament played on red clay courts. It was the 12th edition of the tournament which was part of the 2019 ATP Challenger Tour. It took place in Santiago, Chile between 4 and 10 March 2019.

Singles main-draw entrants

Seeds

 1 Rankings are as of 25 February 2019.

Other entrants
The following players received wildcards into the singles main draw:
  Pablo Andújar
  Gonzalo Lama
  Bastián Malla
  Víctor Núñez
  Alejandro Tabilo

The following player received entry into the singles main draw using a protected ranking:
  Facundo Mena

The following players received entry into the singles main draw using their ITF World Tennis Ranking:
  Matías Franco Descotte
  João Menezes
  João Souza
  Camilo Ugo Carabelli

The following players received entry from the qualifying draw:
  Francisco Cerúndolo
  Gonzalo Villanueva

Champions

Singles

 Hugo Dellien def.  Wu Tung-lin 5–7, 7–6(7–1), 6–1.

Doubles

 Franco Agamenone /  Fernando Romboli def.  Facundo Argüello /  Martín Cuevas 7–6(7–5), 1–6, [10–6].

References 

Challenger ATP Cachantún Cup
2019
2019 in Chilean tennis
March 2019 sports events in South America